Gaurav Kumar is an Indian politician in the Samajwadi Party. He was elected as a member of the Uttar Pradesh Legislative Assembly from Zaidpur on 24 October 2019.

References

Living people
Members of the Uttar Pradesh Legislative Assembly
Samajwadi Party politicians
1984 births
Samajwadi Party politicians from Uttar Pradesh